Pamalican Island, also known as Pamalikan, is a small and sandy island of the Cuyo Islands in the Sulu Sea, between Palawan and Panay, in the north part of the Palawan Province of the Philippines. The island is set in the middle of a  coral reef. Pamalican can be found 7 miles southwest of Quiniluban island and 3 miles northeast of Manamoc island.

The island was originally exploited as a struggling family-owned plantation. It was then purchased by Andrés Soriano Jr., a successful businessman. His children then decided to build a resort on the island and leased the management responsibility to establish an exclusive resort. The island is private property and belongs in totality to 7 Seas Resort (owned by the Sorianos). It is part of the high-end resort group, Aman Resorts, under the name Amanpulo. About 40% of the employees are from the neighbouring Manamoc island.

The island is serviced by Dornier 228-202K planes flying from Manila, which are used to ferry customers and to bring supplies to the resort. Each bungalow (casita) comes with a personal buggy for free circulation throughout the island. The atmosphere around the island is extremely tranquil and secluded.

Diving activities are available, allowing for nice coral viewing and encounters with large turtles and rays. Several windsurf boards and sails are provided at the "Windsurf hut" on the north shore. The shallow protected lagoon there allows for easy windsurfing on a flat surface, and is especially favourable during the northern monsoon season (November to May), when the wind blows onshore.

Weather

See also

 List of islands of the Philippines

References

External links
 Pamalican, facts and multimedia

Beaches of the Philippines
Cuyo Archipelago